Basket Club Mazembe, sometimes known as ASB Mazembe, is a Congolese basketball club based in the city of Lubumbashi. Founded in 1958, the team is active on a domestic and pan-African level. The team has participated in the FIBA Africa Basketball League multiple times, with its best performances finishing fourth in 2009 and 2010.

Honours
Cup of Congo
Winners (9): 1993, 2008, 2009, 2010, 2011, 2013, 2014, 2017, 2019, 2020
FIBA Africa Basketball League
Fourth place: 2009, 2010

In African competitions
FIBA Africa Basketball League  (7 appearances)
2009 – 4th Place (6–3)
2010 – 4th Place (3–4)
2011 – 5th Place (4–4)
2012 – 5th Place (1–4)
2014 – 7th Place (3–5)
2017 – Classification Round (2–5)
2018–19 – Group Stage (1–2)

Players

Current roster
The following is the ASB Mazembe roster for the 2020 BAL Qualifying Tournaments:

Notable players

Kami Kabange
Rolly Fula Nganga
Pitchou Kambuy Manga

References

Basketball teams in the Democratic Republic of the Congo
Sport in Lubumbashi
Basketball teams established in 1958
Road to BAL teams